The Croydon Flyover is an overpass located in Croydon, London, England. It is part of the A232 road which connects Orpington with Ewell. The flyover connects Park Lane and the Croydon Underpass, on the A212 road with Duppas Hill Road. It crosses over the A236, Old Town and Southbridge Road and the A212, Lower Coombe Street. The bypass also goes over Croydon High Street close to the Croydon Clocktower. The flyover was constructed as part of an unfinished ring road scheme conceived in the Croydon Plan of 1951 and was opened in 1969.

Landmarks passed on the flyover include the Fairfield Halls, a theatre and arts centre. The Wandle Road multi-storey car park is entered via the bypass, and the road passes within sight of the Centrale shopping centre. The nearest tube station is at Morden, six miles to the north-west, although there is a direct tram connection from Croydon to the District line terminus at Wimbledon.

The flyover was used as a filming location in Danny Boyle's 2002 horror movie 28 Days Later, although the scene was not used.

See also
Croydon Underpass
List of bridges in London

References 

Streets in the London Borough of Croydon
Buildings and structures in the London Borough of Croydon
Elevated overpasses in London